Pudhupettai is a 2006 Indian Tamil-language crime action film written and directed by Selvaraghavan starring his brother Dhanush in the lead role, while Sonia Agarwal and Sneha play supporting roles. It follows the story of a slum-dwelling student from Pudhupettai who rises to become a dreaded gangster in North Chennai as a means of survival. 

Initially upon release, it received mixed reviews from critics and had an average opening at the box office. However, it became a cult classic in subsequent years and is considered as one of the best films in both Selvaraghavan and Dhanush's careers.

Plot
The story is narrated by the main character, "Kokki" Kumar, in a jail cell.

Kumar is a secondary school student who lives in the slums of Pudhupettai, in Chennai. After coming home from a film, he sees his mother's dead body. She was killed by his father, following an argument. After overhearing a conversation between his father and his friend that they plan on killing him too, as he was a witness, Kumar flees from home.

Homeless and with no food, he resorts to begging. He is arrested under false charges while he watches the police arrest criminals on the street. After being released on bail, he befriends Mani and the others, all of whom work for a thug named Anbu. Anbu works for the opposition party's leader Thamizhselvan, who is a criminal and local politician. They take Kumar under their wing and give him petty jobs. During a confrontation with rival gangsters headed by the ruling party's politician Murthy, Kumar kills Murthy's brother single-handedly amidst 100 goons, earning the respect of his gang. Anbu makes him join a gang consisting of professional killers. There, Kumar learns the way of being a killer while surviving attacks from Murthy's men. The gang refuses to help Kumar avoid Murthy's men since their intervention would spark a gang war. Kumar murders several of his opponents singlehandedly, earning him respect from the others.

Krishnaveni is a prostitute who works under Anbu. Kumar likes her and asks Anbu to release her. Anbu is shocked at Kumar's audacity and refuses his request. He thrashes Krishnaveni and orders his men to kill Kumar. Kumar approaches Anbu and begs pardon, but when Anbu refuses, Kumar kills him. Thamizhselvan allows Kumar to take over Anbu's business only if he can survive the night from Anbu's men. Kumar survives, and Thamizhselvan makes good on his word.

Anbu's goons refuse to obey Kumar since he is young and inexperienced. But Kumar kills his opposition, as well as his father, and becomes a dreaded don in North Chennai. Murthy is paralysed by Kumar's men for refusing a truce. Kumar then meets Selvi, Mani's sister, and marries her forcibly on the eve of her wedding. Mani tries to kill Kumar unsuccessfully then joins Murthy's gang. Meanwhile, Krishnaveni reveals that she is pregnant with Kumar's child, and Kumar marries her as well.

Mani becomes an informant and testifies in court over Kumar's killings; Kumar threatens Selvi and her mother and thus avoids charges through witness intimidation. Kumar is the given a post in the party by Thamizhselvan to prevent him from defecting. Due to his increasing crime record and fear of being killed, Kumar asks for a seat as a Member of the Legislative Assembly (MLA) but is ridiculed by everyone, including Thamizhselvan, and ultimately removed after threatening to kill the other members with an aruval. Murthy learns about this and plans to assassinate Kumar and his family. 

Fearing for their safety, Kumar sends Krishnaveni and his newborn son away, but Murthy's men intercept them, kill her, and take the baby. He requests Selvi to ask her brother Mani for help, but she refuses and reveals her displeasure at how Kumar ruined her life and that she plans to return to her former fiancé. Mani is compassionate enough to return the baby safely to Kumar. Kumar then gives the baby to a kind-hearted woman, without revealing himself as the father of the child. The kind-hearted woman is a married woman with two children, who earns her living by working as a housemaid in four houses. Kumar decides to exact revenge and kills Murthy's henchmen in his residence, but his right hand is crippled during a fight. Murthy ultimately commits suicide, which is then followed by Kumar’s arrest.

In the present day, the police and prison warden come to retrieve Kumar from his cell, with Kumar under the impression that he is to be executed. However, during the epilogue, it is revealed that the incumbent Chief Minister arranged Kumar’s release and named him as an MLA candidate in the following election. Kumar praises Murthy and ironically states that he would have killed the people responsible for Murthy's death had India not been the birthplace of Gandhi. 

In the epilogue, it is also revealed that Kumar served three times as an MLA and twice as the Finance Minister of Tamil Nadu. Despite his political growth, he still could not find his son. Thamizhselvan retired from politics and has settled abroad with his daughter and grandchildren. Selvi is also revealed to have conducted her second marriage with her former fiance. Two months after her marriage, her husband went missing. After that, she has been committed to an asylum.

Cast 

 Dhanush as Kokki Kumar, a normal boy who lives in Pudhupettai and later becomes a gangster.
 Sonia Agarwal as Selvi, Mani's sister and Kumar’s bride.
 Sneha as Krishnaveni, a prostitute who works under Anbu. Kumar falls for her and later marries her despite his marriage to Selvi.
 Azhagam Perumal as Thamizhselvan, a politician who controls Anbu and Kumar, following the former’s death.
 Bala Singh as Anbu, Tamizhselvan's right hand man.
 Prudhvi Raj as Murthy, Tamizhselvan's and Anbu's rival who eventually becomes Kumar's main rival.
 Thennavan as Selvam.
 Munnar Ramesh as Sekhar, Kokki Kumar's father.
 Nitish Veera as Mani, Anbu's henchman and Kumar's best friend.
 Bharathi Mani as Politician
 Murugadoss as Anbu's henchman.
 Vijay Sethupathi as Anbu's henchman.
 Sai Dheena as Anbu's henchman.
 Pudhupettai Suresh as Ravi, Anbu's henchman.
 Jai as Anbu's henchman.
 Pasi Sathya as a woman who adopts Kumar's baby.

Production
Selvaraghavan originally intended to make a film titled Oru Naal Oru Kanavu for Lakshmi Movie Makers, but shelved the venture and continued working with the same producers and cast as the scrapped film, consisting of Dhanush, Sonia Agarwal and Sneha. 

The film was launched on 6 March 2005, with Aravind Krishna as its cinematographer. Selva first approached Harris Jayaraj for the movie's music, but he refused as it is not his type of genre. After his refusal, Selva finalised Yuvan Shankar Raja as the composer.

Selvaraghavan called the film "an experiment" and stated it had "one of the most complicated screenplays", while revealing he was more nervous about the final product than his previous ventures.

It was also the first Tamil film to be shot in Super 35 mm instead of the Cinemascope format, as well as the first to be released in digital format.

This film marked the first major appearance of actor Vijay Sethupathi, prior to his role in Pizza.

After the release of Pattiyal whose theme was the same as Pudhupettai, Selvaraghavan wanted to redo many of the scenes to avoid unintended comparisons, resulting in the film’s release being delayed. The re-recording was done in Bangkok, with everyone involved working overtime.

Music

Yuvan Shankar Raja and Selvaraghavan renewed their association with this film, who had earlier teamed up to create music for the films Thulluvadho Ilamai (2001), Kaadhal Kondein (2004) and 7G Rainbow Colony (2005). Both the soundtrack and score were composed in Thailand, where Yuvan Shankar Raja worked with the Chao Phraya Symphony Orchestra of Bangkok.

The soundtrack was composed by Yuvan Shankar Raja and released on 15 December 2005. The lyrics were written by Na. Muthukumar, who had previously written the lyrics for Selvaraghavan's earlier films.

Reception

Critical reception
The film received mixed to positive reviews, although critics pointed out the film's slow pace. A reviewer from Sify.com saying it was "heartbreakingly disappointing and is nowhere in the league of his earlier films", and that it "doesn't unfold quickly and moves at snail pace (sic), puffs and pants with too many characters, subplots and (is) quite long for a gangster genre film". A reviewer from The Hindu wrote, "Selvaraghavan dishes out a protracted bloodbath and somehow you feel he has let you down", while the critic at Rediff.com stated that "coming from a director like Selvaraghavan, Puthupettai is unbelievable. He loses grip over the plot and the narration goes haywire".

Ten years after its release, Baradwaj Rangan of The Hindu retrospectively praised the film, stating that "Ten years on, we still haven’t seen another film so unapologetic about the truth that crime does pay."

Box office
It went on to have an average run at the box office despite taking a grand opening, with Selvaraghavan suggesting that excessively violent scenes might have kept family audiences away.

Legacy
Dhanush made a cameo appearance in the 2015 film Vai Raja Vai directed by his wife Aishwarya, reprising his role of Kokki Kumar.

The dialogues "Theeya Velai Seiyyanum Kumaru" (You have to work like fire, Kumar) and "Kadavul Irukaan Kumaru" (God is there, Kumar) inspired the 2013 and 2016 films of the same names, respectively. The dialogue "Theeya Velai Seiyyanum Kumaru" was also reused by Santhanam in Boss Engira Bhaskaran (2010).

References

External links
 

2006 films
2000s crime action films
2006 crime drama films
2006 crime thriller films
Films about organised crime in India
Indian political films
Indian gangster films
Films directed by Selvaraghavan
Political action films
Films scored by Yuvan Shankar Raja
Films set in Chennai
Films shot in Chennai
Indian crime drama films
Indian crime action films
2000s Tamil-language films